Thomas Michael Jopling, Baron Jopling, PC, DL (born 10 December 1930) is a politician in the United Kingdom, and sits in the House of Lords as a member of the Conservative Party.

Life and career

Jopling is the son of Mark Bellerby Jopling (1886–1958), of Masham, North Yorkshire, a partner in Imeson and Jopling (later Jopling, Cawthorn and Blackburn), surveyors, auctioneers and estate agents. He was educated at Cheltenham College and Durham University. He was a farmer and company director, and served on the national council of the National Farmers Union. Jopling was a councillor on Thirsk Rural District Council.

Having previously stood unsuccessfully in Wakefield in 1959, Jopling was elected Conservative MP for Westmorland, now in Cumbria, in 1964 and became Parliamentary Secretary to the Treasury from 1979 to 1983.
In 1983, he was elected for Westmorland and Lonsdale after boundary changes, and was appointed Minister of Agriculture, Fisheries and Food from 1983 to 1987.

In his Diaries, the military historian and Tory member of Parliament Alan Clark famously quoted what he claimed was Jopling's "snobby but cutting" dismissal of the ambitious Conservative deputy prime minister Michael Heseltine: "The trouble with Michael is that he had to buy all his furniture".

After over 32 years as a member of the House Commons, he stood down at the 1997 general election and was succeeded by Tim Collins. He was absent during the last few weeks of his Commons career as he was severely injured in a go-karting accident in February 1997. He returned to the House on the last day it sat before it dissolved for the election, and was greeted at Prime Minister’s Questions by John Major at his last question session on 20 March.

Jopling was made a life peer as Baron Jopling, of Ainderby Quernhow in the County of North Yorkshire on 5 June 1997. He is a member of the Privy Council and the America All Party Parliamentary Group.

Personal life

Jopling married Hilary Gail Dickinson (b. 1936) in 1958; she was appointed an MBE in 2017. The couple had two sons: the Hon. Nicholas Mark Fletcher Jopling (born 4 October 1961) and the Hon. Jeremy Michael Neal Jopling (born 15 June 1963). Nicholas is active in the Conservative Party, having contested the Sedgefield constituency at the 1992 general election, but losing to the future Labour Party leader and Prime Minister, Tony Blair. Nicholas's son, Caspar (Jopling's grandson) is married to singer Ellie Goulding.

His younger son, Jeremy (known as 'Jay'), is a British contemporary art dealer and gallerist, who was married to Sam Taylor-Wood, one of the Young British Artists.

Jopling is an Honorary member of the Buck's and Royal Automobile clubs. He lives at Ainderby Hall in Thirsk.

See also
Politics of the United Kingdom
Members of the House of Lords

References

External links

|-

|-

|-

|-

1930 births
Conservative Party (UK) MPs for English constituencies
Conservative Party (UK) life peers
Councillors in North Yorkshire
Cumbria MPs
Deputy Lieutenants of North Yorkshire
Living people
Agriculture ministers of the United Kingdom
Members of the Privy Council of the United Kingdom
People educated at Cheltenham College
UK MPs 1964–1966
UK MPs 1966–1970
UK MPs 1970–1974
UK MPs 1974
UK MPs 1974–1979
UK MPs 1979–1983
UK MPs 1983–1987
UK MPs 1987–1992
UK MPs 1992–1997
People from Masham
Alumni of King's College, Newcastle
Life peers created by Elizabeth II